The Canton of Buzançais is an administrative division of the Indre department, central France. Its borders were modified at the French canton reorganisation which came into effect in March 2015. Its seat is in Buzançais.

It consists of the following communes:
 
Argy
Arpheuilles
Buzançais
La Chapelle-Orthemale
Châtillon-sur-Indre
Chezelles
Cléré-du-Bois
Clion
Fléré-la-Rivière
Murs
Niherne
Palluau-sur-Indre
Saint-Cyran-du-Jambot
Saint-Genou
Saint-Lactencin
Saint-Maur (partly)
Saint-Médard
Sougé
Le Tranger
Villedieu-sur-Indre

References

Cantons of Indre